Barlovento (Spanish for windward) is a municipality in the northern part of the island of La Palma, one of the Canary Islands, and a part of the province of Santa Cruz de Tenerife. Barlovento is on the main highway which encircles the island. The land rises steeply from a small coastal plain, to the rim of the Caldera de Taburiente at Pico de la Cruz (2,350m)

The majority of the municipality is rural, with the only town being Barlovento, where the ayuntamiento (municipal office) is, at 548m above sea level. Being in the cloudier North East of the island, with a short, rocky, coastline, there is less tourism than other municipalities, although there are a number of casas rurales for rent. There is, however, a large recreation zone and campsite at the Laguna de Barlovento, an artificial reservoir, which is the largest area of freshwater on the island. There are also saltwater bathing pools, the Piscina Fajana, with a restaurant and other facilities at Punta del Corcho, near the Faro de Punta Complida lighthouse, at the North Eastern point of the island. There are beautiful laurisilva forests in the municipality.

Historical population

See also
List of municipalities in Santa Cruz de Tenerife

References 

Municipalities in La Palma